The foreign policy of Sweden is based on the premise that national security is best served by staying free of alliances in peacetime in order to remain a neutral country in the event of war. In 2002, Sweden revised its security doctrine. The security doctrine still states that "Sweden pursues a policy of non-participation in military alliances," but permits cooperation in response to threats against peace and security. The government also seeks to maintain Sweden's high standard of living. These two objectives require heavy expenditures for social welfare, defense spending at rates considered low by Western European standards (currently around 1.2% of GNP), and close attention to foreign trade opportunities and world economic cooperation.

United Nations

Sweden has been a member of the United Nations since November 19, 1946, and participates actively in the activities of the organization, including as an elected member of the Security Council (1957–1958, 1975–1976, 1997–1998 and 2017–2018), providing Dag Hammarskjöld as the second elected Secretary-General of the UN, etc. The strong interest of the Swedish Government and people in international cooperation and peacemaking has been supplemented in the early 1980s by renewed attention to Nordic and European security questions.

Sweden decided not to sign the Treaty on the Prohibition of Nuclear Weapons.

European Union
After the then Prime Minister Ingvar Carlsson had submitted Sweden's application in July 1991 the negotiations began in February 1993. Finally, on January 1, 1995, Sweden became a member of the European Union. While some argued that it went against Sweden's historic policy of neutrality, where Sweden had not joined during the Cold War because it was seen as incompatible with neutrality, others viewed the move as a natural extension of the economic cooperation that had been going on since 1972 with the EU. Sweden addressed this controversy by reserving the right not to participate in any future EU defense alliance. In membership negotiations in 1993–1994, Sweden also had reserved the right to make the final decision on whether to join the third stage of the EMU "in light of continued developments." In a nationwide referendum in November 1994, 52.3 percent of participants voted in favour of EU membership. Voter turnout was high, 83.3 percent of the eligible voters voted. The main Swedish concerns included winning popular support for EU cooperation, EU enlargement, and strengthening the EU in areas such as economic growth, job promotion, and environmental issues.

In polls taken a few years after the referendum, many Swedes indicated that they were unhappy with Sweden's membership in the EU. However, after Sweden successfully hosted its first presidency of the EU in the first half of 2001, most Swedes today have a more positive attitude towards the EU. The government, with the support of the Center Party, decided in spring 1997 to remain outside of the EMU, at least until 2002. A referendum was held on September 14, 2003. The results were 55.9% for no, 42.0% yes and 2.1% giving no answer ("blank vote").

Nordic Council
Swedish foreign policy has been the result of a wide consensus. Sweden cooperates closely with its Nordic neighbors, formally in economic and social matters through the Nordic Council of Ministers and informally in political matters through direct consultation.

Nonalignment

Swedish neutrality and nonalignment policy in peacetime may partly explain how the country could stay out of wars since 1814. Swedish governments have not defined nonalignment as precluding outspoken positions in international affairs. Government leaders have favored national liberation movements that enjoy broad support among developing world countries, with notable attention to Africa. During the Cold War, Sweden was suspicious of the superpowers, which it saw as making decisions affecting small countries without always consulting those countries. With the end of the Cold War, that suspicion has lessened somewhat, although Sweden still chooses to remain nonaligned. Sweden has devoted particular attention to issues of disarmament, arms control, and nuclear nonproliferation and has contributed importantly to UN and other international peacekeeping efforts, including the NATO-led peacekeeping forces in the Balkans. It sat as an observer in the Western European Union from 1995 to 2011, but it is not an active member of NATO's Partnership for Peace and the Euro-Atlantic Partnership Council.

Sweden's engagement with NATO was especially strengthened during the term of Anders Fogh Rasmussen.

Sweden's nonalignment policy has led it to serve as the protecting power for a number of nations who don't have formal diplomatic relations with each other for various reasons.  It currently represents the United States, Canada, and several Western European nations in North Korea for consular matters.  On several occasions when the United Kingdom broke off relations with Iran (including the 1979 Iranian Revolution, the Salman Rushdie affair, and the 2011 storming of the British embassy in Tehran), Sweden served as the protecting power for the UK.

In May 2022, Sweden formally applied to join the NATO alliance. The public opinion in the Nordic region had changed in favour of joining NATO since Russia's invasion of Ukraine on February 24 of the same year..

Russian Foreign Ministry spokeswoman Maria Zakharova said in March 2022 that her government would have to respond if Sweden became a NATO member. However, in June 2022 President Vladimir Putin contradicted the statement, claiming that Sweden and Finland can "join whatever they want” on the condition that there will be no NATO military deployment in either country.

Military 
Sweden has employed its military on numerous occasions since the end of the Cold War, from Bosnia and Congo to Afghanistan and Libya. According to one study, "this military activism is driven both by the Swedish internationalist tradition of "doing good" in the world, but also for instrumental purposes. These include a desire for political influence in international institutions, an interest in collective milieu shaping, and a concern to improve the interoperability and effectiveness of the Swedish military."

Participation in international organizations

AfDB
Amnesty International
AsDB
Australia Group
BIS
CBSS
Council of Europe
CERN
EAPC
EBRD
ECE
EIB
ESA
EU
FAO
G-9
G-10
IADB
IAEA
IBRD
ICAO
ICC
ICCt
ICRM
IDA
IEA
IFAD
IFC
IFRCS
IHO
ILO
IMF
IMO
Inmarsat
Intelsat
Interpol
IOC
IOM
ISO
ITU
ITUC
MINURSO
NAC
Nordic Council
NEA
NIB
NSG
OECD
OPCW
OSCE
PCA
PFP
Transport Community
 UN
UNCTAD
UNESCO
UNHCR
UNHRC
UNIDO
UNIKOM
UNITAR
UNMEE
UNMIBH
UNMIK
UNMOGIP
UNMOP
UNOMIG
UNTAET
UNTSO
UNEP
UPU
WCO
WEU (observer)
EFTU
WFP
WHO
WIPO
WMO
WTrO
Zangger Committee

Multilateral

Africa

Americas

Asia

Europe

Oceania

See also
Politics of Sweden
List of diplomatic missions in Sweden
List of diplomatic missions of Sweden
List of state visits made by King Carl XVI Gustaf of Sweden
Scandinavian defense union
Visa requirements for Swedish citizens
Arctic policy of Sweden
List of ambassadors of Sweden to Ukraine

References

Further reading
 Elgström, Ole, and Magnus Jerneck. "Activism and adaptation: Swedish security strategies, 1814–85." Diplomacy and Statecraft 8.3 (1997): 210–236.
 Grimberg, Carl. A History of Sweden (1935) online free
 Horn, David Bayne. Great Britain and Europe in the eighteenth century (1967) covers 1603–1702; pp 236–69.
 Lindström, Peter, and Svante Norrhem. Flattering Alliances: Scandinavia, Diplomacy and the Austrian-French Balance of Power, 1648–1740 (Nordic Academic Press, 2013).
 Makko, Aryo. Ambassadors of Realpolitik: Sweden, the CSCE and the Cold War (2016) excerpt
 Nordstrom, Byron J. The History of Sweden (2002) excerpt and text search; also full text online free to borrow
 Salmon, Patrick. Scandinavia and the great powers 1890–1940 (Cambridge University Press, 2002).
 Sevin, Efe. Public diplomacy and the implementation of foreign policy in the US, Sweden and Turkey (Springer International Publishing, 2017).
İzmir su arıtma

External links
CIA World Factbook – Sweden
United States Department of State – Sweden
"Sweden and Africa — a policy to address common challenges and opportunities" White paper delivered by the Minister of Foreign Affairs to the Riksdag March 6, 2008